Hashemzadeh is a surname. Notable people with the surname include:

Masoud Hashemzadeh (born 1981), Iranian sport wrestler
Mohammad Hashemzadeh (born 1977), Iranian futsal player and coach

Surnames of Iranian origin